Heather Hudson may refer to:

 Heather Hudson (artist), artist who has worked primarily on games
 Heather Hudson (Exiles), also known as Sasquatch, fictional character in the Marvel Comics Exiles series
 Vindicator (comics), aka Heather MacNeil Hudson and Guardian, fictional character in the Marvel Comics universe